Junghans Uhren GmbH is a German watch and clock manufacturer. The company is located in the district of Rottweil, in the town of Schramberg, Baden-Württemberg, southwest Germany.

History

On 15 April 1861 Erhard Junghans created the company Junghans und Tobler together with his brother-in-law Jakob Zeller-Tobler in Schramberg. By the year 1903, Junghans had the largest watch and clock factory, with over 3000 employees.

The company began to produce wristwatches in 1927, and over the following decades created clocks and watches for the civilian market and the German air force. Beginning in the 1950s, the Bauhaus-trained designer Max Bill created products for the firm, notably the teardrop-shaped "Kitchen Clock with Timer", which can be found in the collection of The Museum of Modern Art, and followed by a series of watches, the first of which launched in 1961. The relationship between Junghans and Bill lasted many years, and the company has continued to release new models based on his work. Many of the firm's best-selling watches today are based on those designed by Bill. 

The company served as the official timekeeper for the 1972 Summer Olympics in Munich. In the late 1980s, Junghans introduced the first radio-controlled table clock on the world market. In 1990 the first radio-controlled wristwatch, called the MEGA 1, followed, designed by Hartmut Esslinger and his firm Frog Design. In 1995 Junghans presented a solar-powered watch with ceramic housing. Together with the Japanese firm Seiko, Junghans developed a globally-oriented wristwatch that automatically sets the local time in respective time zones.

Junghans Defence Industry 
The Junghans Microtec GmbH was a division of Junghans Uhren GmbH founded in the mid 1980s, which was formally spun out into a separate legal entity in 1999, and produces fuze-technology for artillery, mortar, medium-calibre, tanks, anti-tank and cruise missiles. Junghans Microtec is located in the small town of Dunningen-Seedorf, close to Schramberg. The company produces fuses for 76 mm to 203 mm artillery. The small German tank Wiesel AWC uses the Junghans fuse MFZ/M as a standard performance.

In December 2010 WikiLeaks posted documents from US anti-terror officials, which said that the production facilities of Junghans Microtec GmbH would be endangered by terrorist attacks.

Junghans Timepieces (Gallery)

See also
List of German watchmakers
Nomos Glashütte
Glashütte Original

References

External links
 Junghans Germany
 Junghans America
 

Companies based in Baden-Württemberg
Watch manufacturing companies of Germany
Defence companies of Germany
Black Forest
German brands
Luxury brands
Watch brands
Clock brands
Manufacturing companies established in 1861
19th-century establishments in Württemberg
German companies established in 1861